The New York Republican State Committee, established in 1855, is the New York State affiliate of the United States Republican Party (GOP). The party has headquarters in Albany, Buffalo, and New York City. The purpose of the committee is to nominate Republican candidates for election to New York and federal political roles. It also assists its nominees in their election campaigns.

History
The New York Republican State Committee was established in 1855, one year after the founding of the "Republican Party" by William H. Seward and Thurlow Weed. Initially, the committee met every three years to plan the Republican National Convention and it occasionally met during the election campaigning periods. The committee nominees were first politically successful in 1856. Since 1959, Nelson Rockefeller (1959–73) and George Pataki (1995–2006) have been the only two elected Republican governors of New York.

Until 1911, the New York Republican State Committee nominated its candidates through a primary or caucus system, which meant the average voter had very little input as to who would be their choice for the state and federal offices. That system was taken out of practice after the passing of the Direct Primary Law in 1911, which allowed for more input from those present at the primary.

Organization

County committee
New York State has 62 counties. Every two years, in each county, Republicans elect a "Republican County Committee". The chair of each county committee is the face of the Republican Party in that county. New York also has 150 Assembly districts. Republicans elect one male and one female leader in each district. The district leaders form part of the executive committee of the respective county committee. The chair and the executive committee seek new party members; control local finances; find candidates to run for public office and choose the nominee (unless both candidates have petitioned enough signatures to trigger a primary).

State committee
The New York State Republican State Committee is composed of one male and one female representative from each Assembly District. Before each statewide election, the committee organises a party convention and chooses candidates for offices of the state. 60% of the committee's vote is needed to win the party's nomination. If no candidate wins 60% of the committee's vote, the candidates with more than 25 percent of the committee's vote compete in a "primary" which is held in the month of September. A candidate with less than 25 percent of the committee's vote may compete in the "primary" if they have a petition of support of greater than 15000 voters.

The State Committee also elects one National Committeewoman and one National Committeeman to represent the state committee to the Republican National Committee in Washington, D.C. The current National Committee members are Jennifer Saul, a Republican fundraiser and former chairwoman of the New York County Republican Committee, and Lawrence Kadish, a  real estate developer from downstate New York.

Current elected officials
The New York Republican Party holds 20 out of the 63 seats in the New York State Senate and eleven of the state's 26 U.S. House seats.

Members of Congress

U.S. Senate
 None

Both of New York's U.S. Senate seats have been held by Democrats since 1998. Al D'Amato was the last Republican to represent New York in the U.S. Senate. First elected in 1980, D'Amato lost his bid for a fourth term in 1998 to Chuck Schumer who has held the seat since.

U.S. House of Representatives
Out of the 26 seats New York is apportioned in the U.S. House of Representatives, eleven are held by Republicans:
 NY-01: Nick LaLota
 NY-02: Andrew Garbarino
 NY-03: George Santos
 NY-04: Anthony D'Esposito
 NY-11: Nicole Malliotakis
 NY-17: Mike Lawler
 NY-19: Marc Molinaro
 NY-22: Brandon Williams
 NY-21: Elise Stefanik
NY-22: Claudia Tenney 
 NY-23: Nick Langworthy

State legislative leaders

New York State Senate 
 Rob Ortt: Minority Leader
 Andrew Lanza: Deputy Minority Leader
 Patty Ritchie: Chair of the Senate Minority Conference
 Sue Serino: Vice Chair of the Senate Minority Conference
 Patrick Gallivan: Minority Whip
 Joseph Griffo: Assistant Minority Leader

New York State Assembly 

 Will Barclay: Minority Leader
 Andy Goodell: Minority Leader Pro Tempore
 Mary Beth Walsh: Assistant Minority Leader Pro Tempore
 Michael Norris: Chair of the Assembly Minority Conference
 Jake Ashby: Vice Chair of the Assembly Minority Conference
 Michael Montesano: Minority Whip

Republican presidents from New York 
 Chester A. Arthur (1881−1885)
 Theodore Roosevelt (1901−1909)
 Donald Trump (2017−2021)

List of chairpersons

See also

 Elections in New York (state)
 New York State Democratic Committee
 Political party strength in New York
 Rockefeller Republican
 The New York Young Republican Club

References

External links
 New York Republican State Committee
 New York State Senate Republican Campaign Committee
 New York State Federation of Republican Women
 New York Young Republican Club

New York
Political parties in New York (state)
1855 establishments in New York (state)